Steamroller may refer to:
 Steamroller, a road-building vehicle, originally powered by steam
 Road roller, a more generic term for the same vehicle
"Steamroller" a 1962 story of The Railway Series book Gallant Old Engine
 "Steamroller", a usually cylindrical waterless bong, a type of tobacco pipe.

Others 
 "Steamroller Blues", the song by James Taylor
 Steamroller (microarchitecture), the AMD computer microarchitecture
 Steam-Roller (G.I. Joe), the G.I. Joe character
Providence Steam Roller, a former National Football league team